Stary Paczków  is a village in the administrative district of Gmina Paczków, within Nysa County, Opole Voivodeship, in south-western Poland, close to the Czech border. It is located within the historic region of Lower Silesia.

Initially named Paczków, it was renamed Stary Paczków (meaning "Old Paczków") after the newly founded town of Paczków nearby took the name in 1254. In a medieval document from 1338 the village was mentioned under the Latinized name Antiquum Paczcow. The name Paczków comes from the Old Polish male name Pakosław. In 1861 the village was inhabited by 810 people, solely of Catholic confession. Between 1871 and 1945 it was part of Germany.

The landmark of Stary Paczków is the medieval Church of All Saints.

References

Villages in Nysa County